Stephen Lee (November 11, 1955 – August 14, 2014) was an American actor from Englewood, New Jersey.

Early life
Lee was born in Englewood, New Jersey. He was raised in Kansas City, Missouri. He studied at Avila College.

Biography
Lee appeared in over 90 different television shows, including playing the role of the annoying cabinet installer on Seinfeld, a criminal informant in Nash Bridges, and a foreign diplomat on the 1980s television show Night Court (season 9, episode 3), as well as several episodes of Dark Angel where he played Dan Vogelsang, a private investigator; and a bomb maker in CSI (season 1, episode 13). He had parts in fourteen movies, including La Bamba, Dolls, WarGames, RoboCop 2, The Negotiator, and others. Lee also guest starred in two episodes of Star Trek: The Next Generation.

Death
On August 14, 2014, Lee died of a heart attack at the age of 58.

Filmography

References

External links

1955 births
2014 deaths
Male actors from New Jersey
American male film actors
American male television actors
People from Englewood, New Jersey
Avila University alumni